Thalpophila is a genus of moths of the family Noctuidae.

Species
 Thalpophila matura (Hufnagel, 1766)
 Thalpophila vitalba (Freyer, 1834)

References
Natural History Museum Lepidoptera genus database
Thalpophila at funet

 
Hadeninae
Taxa named by Jacob Hübner